Litvin (masculine), Litvina (feminine) is a Slavic surname. The equivalent Ukrainian-language surname is Lytvyn.

The surname or nickname 'Litvin' may refer to:
 Michalon Litvin or Michalon the Lithuanian, medieval chronicler
 Natasha Litvina, pianist and author
 Vladimir Litvin, Ukrainian politician

See also
 
 Litvak (disambiguation)
 Litvinov
 Litwin

Russian-language surnames
Surnames of Lithuanian origin